Pedro Miguel Silva Rodrigues (born 30 September 1997) known as Pedrinho Rodrigues, is a Portuguese footballer  who plays for F.C. Famalicão, as a forward.

Football career
On 23 July 2017, Rodrigues made his professional debut with Famalicão in a 2017–18 Taça da Liga match against Santa Clara.

References

External links

1997 births
Living people
Portuguese footballers
Association football midfielders
F.C. Famalicão players